Anis Nuur (born 24 January 1997) is a footballer who plays as a midfielder for Hartley Wintney. Born in England, he represents the Somalia national team at international level.

Club career
Nuur began his career in the youth set-up at Colliers Wood United. During the 2017–18 season, Nuur played for Balham. In the following season, Nuur spent time with Tooting & Mitcham United and Hanwell Town, before joining Westfield. In 2020, Nuur signed for Hartley Wintney, making eleven appearances in all competitions for the club. In October 2021, after starting the season at Cray Wanderers, Nuur signed for Hendon. In February 2022, Nuur signed for Metropolitan Police.

International career
On 27 March 2022, Nuur made his debut for Somalia in a 2–1 loss against Eswatini in the qualification for the 2023 Africa Cup of Nations.

References

1997 births
Living people
Association football midfielders
Footballers from Bermondsey
English footballers
People with acquired Somali citizenship
Somalian footballers
Somalia international footballers
English people of Somali descent
Tooting & Mitcham United F.C. players
Hanwell Town F.C. players
Westfield F.C. (Surrey) players
Hartley Wintney F.C. players
Cray Wanderers F.C. players
Hendon F.C. players
Metropolitan Police F.C. players
Combined Counties Football League players
Isthmian League players
Southern Football League players
Black British sportspeople